Crassispira seiuncta is an extinct species of sea snail, a marine gastropod mollusk in the family Pseudomelatomidae, the turrids and allies.

Description
The length of the shell attains 40 mm.

Distribution
Fossils have been found in Pliocene strata in Piemonte, Italy.

References

 Bellardi, L. 1877. Molluschi dei terreni terziarii del Piemonte e della Liguria. Parte 11. Gastropoda (Pleurotomidae). Memorie delh Real Accademia delle Scienze di Torino, II ser. 29, 1-364

External links
  Marta Zunino, Giulio Pavio: Lower to middle Miocene mollusc assemblages from the Torino hills NW Italy Synthesis of new data and chronostratigraphical arrangement

seiuncta
Gastropods described in 1877